John Stuart  Roberts (born 22 October 1951) is a male British former swimmer.

Swimming career
Roberts competed in two events at the 1968 Summer Olympics. At the ASA National British Championships he won the 110 yards breaststroke title and the 220 yards breaststroke title in 1968.

References

1951 births
Living people
British male swimmers
Olympic swimmers of Great Britain
Swimmers at the 1968 Summer Olympics
People from Eccles, Greater Manchester